"Make It in America" is a song performed by the Victorious cast featuring Victoria Justice. It was co-written by Justice, for Victorious 2.0: More Music from the Hit TV Show (2012), the soundtrack to the Nickelodeon television series, Victorious. It was released as the album's first and only single on May 15, 2012 through Columbia Records in association with Nickelodeon. Musically, the song runs through a pop beat.

Music video
The music video premiered on Nickelodeon on May 19, 2012 and features Victoria and the cast singing the song in a car in the desert and in the end, at a party.

Performances
In addition to playing music in the special episode "Tori Goes Platinum" Victoria was in the program The Ellen DeGeneres Show to play the song. She also made a small demonstration in Orlando in Universal Studios along with the cast of Victorious, in which it is carried out. The song was on the set list of Justice's second tour, Summer Break Tour (2013).

Charts

Release history

References

2012 songs
2012 singles
Columbia Records singles
Songs from television series
Songs written by Martin Johnson (musician)
Songs written by Victoria Justice
Victoria Justice songs
Victorious